The Toy Museum is a toy museum located (since 2005) in Spårvägsmuseet in Södermalm, Stockholm. It was originally located at Mariatorget, where it first opened on August 30, 1980. One notable attraction is the railway modelling collection of the Railway Society (Järnvägssällskapet). The focus is on "the 20th century, with emphasis on technical toys". Now Leksaksmuseet is located in Nacka at Saltsjö-Pir in brand new premises.

External links

 Official Leksaksmuseet Website

Museums in Stockholm
Toy museums
Museums established in 1980
1980 establishments in Sweden